Nor Nork (Nor Nork) is one of the 12 districts of Yerevan, the capital of Armenia. It is located at the eastern part of the city. It is bordered by the districts of Nork-Marash, Kentron and Kanaker-Zeytun from the west, Avan from the north and Erebuni from the south. Kotayk Province forms the eastern border of the district.

The district is unofficially divided into smaller neighborhoods including the 9 blocks of Nor Nork and the Bagrevand neighborhood. As of the 2011 census, the population of the district is 126,065.

Streets and landmarks

Main streets
Davit Bek street
Gai avenue
Tevosyan street
Gyurjyan street
Minski street
Vilnyus street

Landmarks
Saint Sarkis Church (built in 1999)
Holy Mother of God Church (built in 2014)
Fridtjof Nansen Park
Tatul Krpeyan Park
Vaspurakan Park
Suren Nazaryan Garden
Tigranes the Great Park
Yerevan Zoo
Yerevan Water World
Vazgen Sargsyan Military Institute
Ministry of Defence of Armenia

Gallery

References

Populated places in Yerevan
Districts of Yerevan